Nathaniel William Herbig (born July 10, 1998) is an American football offensive guard for the Pittsburgh Steelers of the National Football League (NFL). He played college football at Stanford and signed with the Philadelphia Eagles as an undrafted free agent in 2019.

Early life and high school
Herbig was born in Lihue, Hawaii and originally grew up in Kalaheo, Hawaii before moving from Kauai to Oahu after his freshman year of high school so that he could attend Saint Louis School in Honolulu. He was named first-team All-State as a senior. Herbig committed to play college football at Stanford after his junior year, but de-committed and re-opened his recruitment shortly after the end of his senior season. He ultimately re-committed to Stanford after considering offers from California and Washington.

College career
 Herbig played three seasons for the Stanford Cardinal. He played in all 13 of Stanford's games with six starts at left guard and was named a freshman All-American by ESPN. He moved to right guard as a sophomore, making 13 starts and was named first-team All-Pac-12 Conference. 

Herbig was named second-team All-Pac-12 as a junior after making six starts at right guard and one start at right tackle while missing six games due to injury. Following his Junior season, Herbig announced that he would forgo his final year of college to declare for the 2019 NFL Draft.

Professional career

Although initially projected to be a mid-round pick, Herbig's draft stock fell significantly after a poor performance at the NFL Scouting Combine that included a 40-yard dash time of 5.41 seconds, the slowest run of all 260 participants. He ultimately went unselected in the 2019 NFL Draft.

Philadelphia Eagles
Herbig signed with the Philadelphia Eagles as an undrafted free agent on April 28, 2019. Herbig made his NFL debut on December 15, 2019, against the Washington Redskins. Herbig played in two games in his rookie season.

Herbig made his first career start on September 13, 2020, in the Eagles' season opener against the Washington Football Team.

After the team suffered injuries to both of their starting guards, Herbig started five games and appeared in five other games at guard for the Eagles in 2021. He was placed on the COVID list on January 3, 2022. He was activated one week later on January 10, missing just one game where the Eagles did not play their starters.

On March 15, 2022, the Eagles placed a restricted free agent tender on Herbig. After signing the tender, he was waived by the team on May 4, 2022.

New York Jets
On May 5, 2022, Herbig was claimed off waivers by the New York Jets.

Pittsburgh Steelers
On March 16, 2023, Herbig signed a two-year contract with the Pittsburgh Steelers.

Personal
Herbig's father, Bruce, played football and basketball at Lewis & Clark College and his grandfather played football at Wheaton College in Illinois. His younger brother Nick plays linebacker at Wisconsin.

References

External links
 New York Jets bio
 Stanford Cardinals bio

1998 births
Living people
American football offensive guards
New York Jets players
Pittsburgh Steelers players
People from Kauai County, Hawaii
Philadelphia Eagles players
Players of American football from Hawaii
Saint Louis School alumni
Stanford Cardinal football players